Peter McNeil may refer to:

 Peter McNeil (footballer) (1854–1901), Scottish footballer 
 Peter McNeil (architect) (1917–1989), Canadian architect

See also
 Peter MacNeill (active from 1973), Canadian film and television actor and voice-over artist